The near side of the Moon is the lunar hemisphere that always faces towards Earth, opposite to the far side. Only one side of the Moon is visible from Earth because the Moon rotates on its axis at the same rate that the Moon orbits the Earth—a situation known as tidal locking.

The Moon is directly illuminated by the Sun, and the cyclically varying viewing conditions cause the lunar phases. Sometimes the dark portion of the Moon is faintly visible due to earthshine, which is indirect sunlight reflected from the surface of Earth and onto the Moon.

Since the Moon's orbit is both somewhat elliptical and inclined to its equatorial plane, libration allows up to 59% of the Moon's surface to be viewed from Earth (though only half at any moment from any point).

Orientation

The image of the Moon here is drawn as is normally shown on maps, that is with north on top and west to the left. Astronomers traditionally turn the map to have south on top to correspond with the northern-hemisphere view in astronomical telescopes, which typically show the image upside down.

West and east on the Moon are where they would be expected, when standing on the Moon. But when the Moon is seen from Earth, then the east–west direction is reversed. When specifying coordinates on the Moon it should therefore always be mentioned whether geographic (or rather selenographic) coordinates are used or astronomical coordinates.

The Moon's actual orientation in Earth's sky or on the horizon depends on the viewers geographic latitude on Earth. In the following description a few typical cases will be considered.

On the north pole, if the Moon is visible, it stands low above the horizon with its north pole up.
In mid northern latitudes (North America, Europe, Asia) the Moon rises in the east with its northeastern limb up (Mare Crisium), it reaches its highest point in the south with its north on top, and sets in the west with its northwestern limb (Mare Imbrium) on top.
On the equator, when the Moon rises in the east, its N — S axis appears horizontal and Mare Foecunditatis is on top. When it sets in the west, about 12.5 hours later, the axis is still horizontal, and Oceanus Procellarum is the last area to dip below the horizon. In between these events, the Moon reached its highest point in the zenith and then its selenographic directions are lined up with those on Earth.
In mid southern latitudes (South America, South Pacific, Australia, South Africa) the Moon rises in the east with its southeastern limb up (Mare Nectaris), it reaches its highest point in the north with its south on top, and sets in the west with its southwestern limb (Mare Humorum) on top.
On the south pole the Moon behaves as on the north pole, but there it appears with its south pole up.

Differences

The two hemispheres have distinctly different appearances, with the near side covered in multiple, large maria (Latin for 'seas'). These lowlands were believed to be seas of lunar water by the astronomers who first mapped them, in the 17th century (notably, Giovanni Battista Riccioli and Francesco Maria Grimaldi). Although no bodies of liquid exist on the Moon, the term "mare" (plural: maria) is still used. The far side has a battered, densely cratered appearance with few maria. Only 1% of the surface of the far side is covered by maria, compared to 31.2% on the near side. According to research analyzed by NASA's Gravity Recovery and Interior Laboratory (GRAIL) mission, the reason for the difference is because the Moon's crust is thinner on the near side compared to the far side. The dark splotches that make up the large lunar maria are lava-filled impact basins that were created by asteroid impacts about four billion years ago. Though both sides of the Moon were bombarded by similarly large impactors, the near side hemisphere crust and upper mantle was hotter than that of the far side, resulting in the larger impact craters. These larger impact craters make up the Man in the Moon references from popular mythology.

See also
 Giant impact hypothesis
 Lists of astronomical objects
 Moon rabbit

References

Further reading

External links
Lunar and Planetary Institute: Exploring the Moon
Lunar and Planetary Institute: Lunar Atlases (archived 18 December 2011)
Ralph Aeschliman Planetary Cartography and Graphics: Lunar Maps (archived 6 February 2004)
NASA's Gravity Recovery and Interior Laboratory (GRAIL) Mission

Lunar science
Hemispheres of Moon